Francis Sylvester Walker (1848–1916) was an Irish painter, illustrator and etcher.

Walker was the son of Thomas Walker, Master of the Workhouse at Dunshaughlin, and Ann Delany of Clavistown Mills, Killmessan, County Meath. He studied Art at both the Royal Dublin Society (RDS) and the Royal Hibernian Academy (RHA) in Dublin. He exhibited at the RHA in 1863, at Burlington House, London in 1905, and in various cities in Britain (Birmingham, Liverpool, Glasgow etc.).  He also became a member of the Royal Society of Painter-Etchers and Engravers (RE).

Walker painted landscapes, portraits and genre works and provided illustrations for various travel books. His works are currently exhibited in places such as the National Gallery of Ireland in Dublin, the British Museum and Victoria and Albert Museum in London.

Illustrated books

Senior, William. The Thames: from Oxford to the Tower (John C. Nimmo. 1891)
Lang, Andrew (Ed.) Poets' country (London, Edinburgh: T.C. & E.C. Jack, 1907).
Tynan, Katherine. Ireland (London: Adam and Charles Black, 1909).
Hall, Mr. & Mrs. S. C. Ireland: its scenery, character and history: Volume 1, Volume 2, Volume 3, Volume 4, Volume 5, Volume 6 (Boston: Niccolls & co., 1911).
Besant, Sir Walter. South London (London: Chatto & Windus, 1912).
Besant, Sir Walter. "Westminster" (London: Chatto & Windus, 1895).

External links

 
 
Biography (at "Angel fine arts")
Ellisland - an etching by Walker (C. 1908)
The Terrace garden (liveauctioneers.com)

1848 births
1916 deaths
19th-century Irish painters
20th-century Irish painters
Irish male painters
Irish etchers
Landscape artists
Irish illustrators
20th-century printmakers
19th-century Irish male artists
20th-century Irish male artists